Eric Maisel (born 1947) is an American psychotherapist, teacher, coach, author and atheist. His books include Fearless Creating (1995), The Van Gogh Blues (2002), Coaching the Artist Within (2005), and The Atheist's Way (2009).

Biography
Eric Maisel was born in the Bronx, and grew up in Brooklyn.

Maisel is a columnist for Professional Artist magazine and a featured contributor to Psychology Today. His books include "Rethinking Depression," “Mastering Creative Anxiety," "Creative Recovery," "A Writer’s San Francisco," and "A Writer’s Paris". He lives in the San Francisco Bay Area with his family.

Maisel is the author of more than 40 books and a creativity coach. He trains creativity coaches and provides training for the Creativity Coaching Association.

Creativity coaching
In the early 1990s, Maisel developed the coaching specialty of creativity coaching. Creativity coaching focuses on helping creative and performing artists meet their emotional and practical challenges.

In his 2005 book Coaching the Artist Within, Maisel presents anecdotal case studies of his creativity coaching work with creative and performing artists and presents lessons of importance to artists, among them "creating in the middle of things," “upholding dreams and testing reality," “committing to goal-oriented process," and "maintaining a creative life."

Mental health
In his 2012 book Rethinking Depression: How to Shed Mental Health Labels and Create Personal Meaning, Maisel rejects the idea that a case has been made for the existence of the “mental disorder of depression,” given the weakness of the construct “mental disorder,” the insufficiency of diagnosing on the basis of symptom pictures alone, and the reasonableness of supposing that what we are seeing is profound sadness instead; and presents an “updated existential program” for dealing with "profound sadness".

Atheism
A lifelong atheist, Maisel described in his 2009 book The Atheist's Way: Living Well Without Gods how individuals can negotiate the paradigm shift from seeking meaning (in religion, spiritual pursuits, or anywhere else) to making meaning.

Books
Dismay Maya Press, 1982
The Blackbirds of Mulhouse Maya Press, 1984
The Fretful Dancer Aegina Press, 1988
Staying Sane in the Arts Tarcher/Penguin, 1992
Artists Speak Harper San Francisco, 1993
Fearless Creating Tarcher/Penguin, 1995
Affirmations for Artists Tarcher/Penguin, 1996
Living the Writer's Life Watson-Guptill, 1999
Deep Writing Tarcher/Penguin, 1999
The Creativity Book Tarcher/Penguin, 2000
20 Communication Tips for Families New World Library, 2000
Sleep Thinking Adams Media, 2000
20 Communication Tips at Work New World Library, 2001
The Van Gogh Blues Rodale, 2002
Write Mind Tarcher/Penguin, 2002
The Art of the Book Proposal Tarcher/Penguin 2004
Writers and Artists on Love New World Library, 2004
Writers and Artists on Devotion New World Library, 2004
Performance Anxiety Backstage Books, 2005
Coaching the Artist Within New World Library, 2005
A Writer's Paris Writer's Digest Books, 2005
A Writer's San Francisco New World Library, 2006
What Would your Character do? Writer's Digest Books, 2006*Toxic Criticism McGraw-Hill, 2007
Ten Zen Seconds Source books, 2007
Creativity for Life New World Library, 2007
Everyday You Conari, 2007
Creative Recovery Shambhala, 2008
A Writer's Space Adam's Media, 2009
 
 
Murder in Berlin Singingwood Press, 2011
Become a Creativity Coach Now Singingwood Press, 2011

References

External links

Eric Maisel, official website for Eric Maisel
The Atheist's Way, official web site for The Atheist's Way
Eric Maisel Interviews, Eric Maisel Interviews

1947 births
American atheists
21st-century American psychologists
American self-help writers
American spiritual writers
Living people
Writers about religion and science
20th-century American psychologists